Urvič is a village in the municipality of Bogovinje, North Macedonia.

Demographics
Urvič has traditionally been inhabited by a Muslim Macedonian (Torbeš) population stemming from the Gorani community. Villagers of Urvič speak the Slavic (Macedonian) Gorani dialect.
	
As of the 2021 census, Urvič had 746 residents with the following ethnic composition:
Turks 627
Albanians 101
Persons for whom data are taken from administrative sources 10
Others 8

According to the 2002 census, the village had a total of 756 inhabitants. Ethnic groups in the village include:
Turks 640
Albanians 113
Macedonians 1
Serbs 6 
Others 2

References

External links

Gorani people
Macedonian Muslim villages
Villages in Bogovinje Municipality
Albanian communities in North Macedonia